The Electoral district of Shepparton and Euroa was a Lower House electoral district of the Victorian Parliament.

The district was intended to be called Goulburn Valley but was changed to Shepparton and Euroa in 1888.

Members

In 1904, Shepparton and Euroa was abolished and Electoral district of Goulburn Valley created.

References

Former electoral districts of Victoria (Australia)
1889 establishments in Australia
1904 disestablishments in Australia